Jerome Virgil Henderson (born August 8, 1969) is the current defensive backs coach for the New York Giants, and a former American football cornerback for the New England Patriots, Buffalo Bills, Philadelphia Eagles and New York Jets of the National Football League (NFL). He played college football at Clemson University and was drafted in the second round of the 1991 NFL Draft. He is currently the defensive backs coach for the New York Giants. He played in two Super Bowls; one with the Buffalo Bills in Super Bowl XXVIII and another with the New England Patriots in Super Bowl XXXI.

Coaching career

Jets
Henderson spent two years coaching defensive backs with the New York Jets.

Browns
Henderson went to Cleveland after his stint with the Jets, following head coach Eric Mangini. He spent  three seasons as the Cleveland Browns' defensive backs coach.

Cowboys
Henderson joined the Cowboys’ staff in 2012. Henderson was reunited with Rob Ryan, who served as the Browns' defensive coordinator from 2009 to 2010 before filling the same role for the Cowboys in 2011. Henderson left Dallas  following the 2015 season.

Falcons
After interviewing for a head coach job with the Browns, Henderson ended up as a coach with the Falcons. In the 2016 season, Henderson and the Falcons reached Super Bowl LI, where they faced the New England Patriots on February 5, 2017. In the Super Bowl, the Falcons fell in a 34–28 overtime defeat. The Falcons dismissed Henderson after the 2019 season, his fourth working for the team. He had served as Atlanta’s secondary coach/defensive passing game coordinator.

Giants
On January 21, 2020 the New York Giants hired Henderson to be the team’s defensive backs coach.

Personal life
Henderson and his wife, Traci, have three children, Jazmin and twins Taylor and Tyler.

References

External links
 http://www.dallascowboys.com/team/coaches/roster/jerome-henderson  Retrieved September 1, 2016

1969 births
Living people
Sportspeople from Portsmouth, Virginia
African-American coaches of American football
African-American players of American football
American football defensive backs
Atlanta Falcons coaches
Buffalo Bills players
Clemson Tigers football players
Cleveland Browns coaches
Dallas Cowboys coaches
New York Giants coaches
New York Jets players
New York Jets coaches
New England Patriots players
Philadelphia Eagles players
Players of American football from Virginia
21st-century African-American people
20th-century African-American sportspeople